The 2001 CHA Men's Ice Hockey Tournament (also known as the 2001 CHA Final Five) was played between March 8 and March 10, 2001, at the Von Braun Center in Huntsville, Alabama. Wayne State defeated Alabama-Huntsville 4–1 in the championship game to win the tournament.

Format
The tournament featured three rounds of play. The top five teams in the regular season conference standings advanced to the tournament. In the first round, the fourth and fifth ranked seeds, Air Force and Findlay, played for entry into the semifinals, to which the top three seeds received byes. The winners of the two semifinal games then played for the championship on March 10, 2001.

Conference standings
Note: GP = Games played; W = Wins; L = Losses; T = Ties; PTS = Points; GF = Goals For; GA = Goals Against

Bracket

Note: * denotes overtime period(s)

Tournament awards

All-Star team
Goaltender: David Guerrera (Wayne State)
Defensemen: Darren Curry (Alabama-Huntsville), Tyler Kindle (Wayne State)
Forwards: Jason Durbin (Wayne State), Dustin Kingston (Wayne State), Ryan McCormack (Alabama-Huntsville), Maxim Starchenko (Wayne State)

MVP
David Guerrera (Wayne State)

References

External links
College Hockey America tournament history

CHA Men's Ice Hockey Tournament
Cha Men's Ice Hockey Tournament
College sports in Alabama